The Women's 82.5 kg powerlifting event at the 2004 Summer Paralympics was competed  on 25 September. It was won by Emma Brown, representing .

Final round

25 Sept. 2004, 13:45

References

W
Para